Thomas R. Dye (born December 16, 1935) is an Emeritus Professor of Political Science at Florida State University and was formerly a McKenzie Professor of Government. Dye has described politics as being about who gets scarce governmental resources, where, when, why and how.

Academic background and preparation
Dye graduated from Pennsylvania State University where he received his B.S. and M.A. degrees; Dye received his Ph.D. from the University of Pennsylvania.

Dye has taught at the University of Pennsylvania, the University of Wisconsin, and the University of Georgia, among other institutions.  He was a visiting scholar at Bar-Ilan University in Israel, and at the Brookings Institution in Washington D.C.

Dye has served as president of the Southern Political Science Association, the Policy Studies Organization, and has served as the secretary of the American Political Science Association.  Presently, Dye served as past president of the Lincoln Center for Public Service.

Areas of interest
Dye's main research interests center on the conflict between the two political organizational theories of Elite theory vs. Pluralism in American politics.  His two best known works The Irony of Democracy (now in its 17th edition) and Who's Running America? (now in its 8th edition, The Obama Reign) discuss this on-going conflict in great detail.

Dye has also researched and published on the role of major campaign contributors, foundations and think tanks, interest groups, and the media in policy formation in Washington, D.C.

Major publications
 Politics in States and Communities (now in 15th edition)
 Politics in America (Political Science text book now in 8th edition)
 Understanding Public Policy (now in 14th edition)
 Who's Running America? (now in 8th edition)
 Top Down Policymaking
 Power and Society
 The Irony of Democracy (now in 17th edition)
 Politics in Florida
 American Politics in the Media Age
 American Federalism
 Policy Analysis: What Governments Do, Why They Do it and What Difference it Makes

Honors and awards
 Harold Lasswell Award for career contributions to the study of public policy
 Donald C. Stone Award for career contributions to the study of federalism
 Outstanding Political Science Alumni Award from the Penn State Department of Political Science

See also
 Elite theory
 Oligarchy
 List of political authors
 List of political scientists

References

External links
 Homepage of Professor Thomas R. Dye
 Penn State University brief bio of Dye.

Living people
American political scientists
American political philosophers
Elite theory
Pennsylvania State University alumni
Florida State University faculty
University of Wisconsin–Madison faculty
University of Georgia faculty
Academic staff of Bar-Ilan University
1935 births
University of Pennsylvania faculty